This is a list of the Italy national football team results from 2010 to the present day. During this period, Italy have achieved second place at UEFA Euro 2012, third place at the 2013 FIFA Confederations Cup, first place at UEFA Euro 2020, third place at 2020–21 UEFA Nations League and second place at CONMEBOL–UEFA Cup of Champions 2022.

Results

2010

2011

2012

2013

2014

2015

2016

2017

2018

2019

2020

2021

2022

1Indicates new coach

2023

Notes

References

External links
 Upcoming fixtures  on FIGC.it
Italy – International Matches 2010–2019 on RSSSF.com

2010s in Italy
Italy national football team results